= Tridib Dastidar =

Bangladeshi poet

Tridib Dastidar (Bengali: ত্রিদিব দস্তিদার) (1952–2004) was a Bangladeshi poet.

== Biography ==
He was born in Patia in Chittagong, to the Dastidar family. Moving to Dhaka in the mid-1970s, he emerged as a bohemian poet. He published six volumes of poetry.

Spending his life in loneliness and dire poverty, he died of illness in Dhaka in 2004.
